Young-sik, also spelled Young-shik or Yong-sik, is a Korean unisex given name. Its meaning differs based on the hanja used to write each syllable of the name. There are 34 hanja with the reading "young" and 16 hanja with the reading "sik" on the South Korean government's official list of hanja which may be registered for use in given names. According to South Korean government data, Young-sik was the sixth-most popular name for baby boys in 1940, falling to seventh place in 1950.

People with this name include:
Young Shik Rhee (1894–1981), South Korean pastor, founder of Daegu University
Jang Young-sik (born 1935), South Korean economist
Kim Young-sik (born 1953), South Korean Kim Jong-il impersonator
Kim Yong-sik (wrestler) (born 1967), North Korean wrestler
Lee Young-Sik (born 1973), South Korean sport shooter
Jung Young-Sik (born 1992), South Korean table tennis player
Pak Yong-sik, North Korean politician
Johan Pahk Yeong-sik, South Korean academic, President of the Catholic University of Korea

References

Korean unisex given names